Pi Ceti, Latinized from π Ceti, is the Bayer designation for a star system in the equatorial constellation of Cetus. It is visible to the naked eye with an apparent visual magnitude of 4.238. Observed to have an Earth half yearly parallax shift of 8.30 mas, it is around 393 light years from the Sun.

This is a single-lined spectroscopic binary system with a nearly circular orbit and a period of 7.45 years. The fact that the system has a negligible eccentricity is surprising for such a long period, and may suggest that the secondary is a white dwarf that had its orbit circularized during a mass-transfer event.

The primary, component A, is a normal B-type star that has been given stellar classifications of B7 V and B7 IV. It appears very young – less than half a million years in age – and may still be on a pre-main sequence track. The star shows no magnetic field but it does emit an infrared excess.

Name
This star, along with ε Cet, ρ Cet and σ Cet, was Al Sufi's Al Sadr al Ḳaiṭos, the Whale's breast/chest (upper torso).
Per Jack Rhoads's Reduced Star Catalog Containing 537 Named Stars, Al Sufi's numerically ordered stars (1 to 4), were ρ (rho), σ (sigma), ε (epsilon) and this star.

Consequently, the Chinese name for the star is  meaning Celestial Meadows: seven.

References

B-type main-sequence stars
Spectroscopic binaries
Cetus (constellation)
Ceti, Pi
Ceti, 89
12770
017081
0811
BD-14 0519